Group C of the 2023 UEFA European Under-21 Championship qualifying competition consists of six teams: Spain, Russia, Slovakia, Northern Ireland, Lithuania, and Malta. The composition of the nine groups in the qualifying group stage was decided by the draw held on 28 January 2021, 12:00 CET (UTC+1), at the UEFA headquarters in Nyon, Switzerland, with the teams seeded according to their coefficient ranking.

On 28 February 2022, Russia was suspended from the competition. On 2 May 2022, UEFA officially announced that Russia would no longer be allowed to take part in the competition, therefore Spain has qualified for the tournament with a game to spare.

Standings

Matches
Times are CET/CEST, as listed by UEFA (local times, if different, are in parentheses).

Goalscorers
The table below includes 19 goals from 6 voided matches.
The Spanish team has scored a total of 41 goals.

Notes

References

External links

Group C
Sports events affected by the 2022 Russian invasion of Ukraine